Olle Zetterstrom (April 23, 1901 – June 28, 1968) was an American cross-country skier. He competed in the men's 18 kilometre event at the 1932 Winter Olympics.

References

1901 births
1968 deaths
American male cross-country skiers
Olympic cross-country skiers of the United States
Cross-country skiers at the 1932 Winter Olympics
People from Östersund